The 1949 VFL season was the 53rd season of the Victorian Football League (VFL), the highest level senior Australian rules football competition in Victoria. The season featured twelve clubs, ran from 16 April until 24 September, and comprised a 19-game home-and-away season followed by a finals series featuring the top four clubs.

The premiership was won by the Essendon Football Club for the ninth time, after it defeated  by 73 points in the 1949 VFL Grand Final.

Premiership season
In 1949, the VFL competition consisted of twelve teams of 18 on-the-field players each, plus two substitute players, known as the 19th man and the 20th man. A player could be substituted for any reason; however, once substituted, a player could not return to the field of play under any circumstances.

Teams played each other in a home-and-away season of 19 rounds; matches 12 to 19 were the "home-and-way reverse" of matches 1 to 8.

Once the 19 round home-and-away season had finished, the 1949 VFL Premiers were determined by the specific format and conventions of the Page–McIntyre system.

Round 1

|- bgcolor="#CCCCFF"
| Home team
| Home team score
| Away team
| Away team score
| Venue
| Crowd
| Date
|- bgcolor="#FFFFFF"
| 
| 21.19 (145)
| 
| 12.11 (83)
| Kardinia Park
| 25,000
| 16 April 1949
|- bgcolor="#FFFFFF"
| 
| 18.12 (120)
| 
| 9.3 (57)
| Windy Hill
| 13,500
| 16 April 1949
|- bgcolor="#FFFFFF"
| 
| 19.13 (127)
| 
| 10.17 (77)
| Victoria Park
| 21,500
| 16 April 1949
|- bgcolor="#FFFFFF"
| 
| 11.10 (76)
| 
| 14.14 (98)
| Junction Oval
| 18,000
| 16 April 1949
|- bgcolor="#FFFFFF"
| 
| 16.16 (112)
| 
| 6.12 (48)
| Princes Park
| 29,000
| 18 April 1949
|- bgcolor="#FFFFFF"
| 
| 19.13 (127)
| 
| 8.10 (58)
| Punt Road Oval
| 30,000
| 18 April 1949

Round 2

|- bgcolor="#CCCCFF"
| Home team
| Home team score
| Away team
| Away team score
| Venue
| Crowd
| Date
|- bgcolor="#FFFFFF"
| 
| 5.13 (43)
| 
| 20.12 (132)
| Glenferrie Oval
| 13,000
| 23 April 1949
|- bgcolor="#FFFFFF"
| 
| 12.7 (79)
| 
| 9.14 (68)
| Western Oval
| 15,500
| 23 April 1949
|- bgcolor="#FFFFFF"
| 
| 12.13 (85)
| 
| 12.10 (82)
| Lake Oval
| 9,000
| 23 April 1949
|- bgcolor="#FFFFFF"
| 
| 7.14 (56)
| 
| 10.15 (75)
| Arden Street Oval
| 20,000
| 23 April 1949
|- bgcolor="#FFFFFF"
| 
| 12.8 (80)
| 
| 11.16 (82)
| MCG
| 29,000
| 23 April 1949
|- bgcolor="#FFFFFF"
| 
| 15.16 (106)
| 
| 15.15 (105)
| Brunswick Street Oval
| 25,000
| 23 April 1949

Round 3

|- bgcolor="#CCCCFF"
| Home team
| Home team score
| Away team
| Away team score
| Venue
| Crowd
| Date
|- bgcolor="#FFFFFF"
| 
| 14.8 (92)
| 
| 9.5 (59)
| Arden Street Oval
| 15,000
| 30 April 1949
|- bgcolor="#FFFFFF"
| 
| 14.14 (98)
| 
| 10.15 (75)
| Kardinia Park
| 19,000
| 30 April 1949
|- bgcolor="#FFFFFF"
| 
| 7.14 (56)
| 
| 8.9 (57)
| Victoria Park
| 30,000
| 30 April 1949
|- bgcolor="#FFFFFF"
| 
| 21.27 (153)
| 
| 7.6 (48)
| Princes Park
| 9,250
| 30 April 1949
|- bgcolor="#FFFFFF"
| 
| 14.16 (100)
| 
| 7.6 (48)
| MCG
| 24,000
| 30 April 1949
|- bgcolor="#FFFFFF"
| 
| 5.15 (45)
| 
| 13.16 (94)
| Junction Oval
| 13,000
| 30 April 1949

Round 4

|- bgcolor="#CCCCFF"
| Home team
| Home team score
| Away team
| Away team score
| Venue
| Crowd
| Date
|- bgcolor="#FFFFFF"
| 
| 17.11 (113)
| 
| 11.14 (80)
| Punt Road Oval
| 12,000
| 7 May 1949
|- bgcolor="#FFFFFF"
| 
| 4.15 (39)
| 
| 12.3 (75)
| Western Oval
| 12,000
| 7 May 1949
|- bgcolor="#FFFFFF"
| 
| 13.15 (93)
| 
| 15.15 (105)
| Brunswick Street Oval
| 17,500
| 7 May 1949
|- bgcolor="#FFFFFF"
| 
| 8.11 (59)
| 
| 7.9 (51)
| Lake Oval
| 12,000
| 7 May 1949
|- bgcolor="#FFFFFF"
| 
| 5.10 (40)
| 
| 9.11 (65)
| Glenferrie Oval
| 11,500
| 7 May 1949
|- bgcolor="#FFFFFF"
| 
| 6.9 (45)
| 
| 7.22 (64)
| Windy Hill
| 29,000
| 7 May 1949

Round 5

|- bgcolor="#CCCCFF"
| Home team
| Home team score
| Away team
| Away team score
| Venue
| Crowd
| Date
|- bgcolor="#FFFFFF"
| 
| 5.16 (46)
| 
| 6.12 (48)
| MCG
| 19,000
| 14 May 1949
|- bgcolor="#FFFFFF"
| 
| 15.13 (103)
| 
| 10.11 (71)
| Kardinia Park
| 15,500
| 14 May 1949
|- bgcolor="#FFFFFF"
| 
| 11.18 (84)
| 
| 9.15 (69)
| Windy Hill
| 21,000
| 14 May 1949
|- bgcolor="#FFFFFF"
| 
| 16.8 (104)
| 
| 10.14 (74)
| Princes Park
| 33,000
| 14 May 1949
|- bgcolor="#FFFFFF"
| 
| 10.8 (68)
| 
| 6.14 (50)
| Lake Oval
| 11,000
| 14 May 1949
|- bgcolor="#FFFFFF"
| 
| 9.13 (67)
| 
| 14.21 (105)
| Glenferrie Oval
| 7,500
| 14 May 1949

Round 6

|- bgcolor="#CCCCFF"
| Home team
| Home team score
| Away team
| Away team score
| Venue
| Crowd
| Date
|- bgcolor="#FFFFFF"
| 
| 15.13 (103)
| 
| 8.12 (60)
| Punt Road Oval
| 21,000
| 21 May 1949
|- bgcolor="#FFFFFF"
| 
| 12.14 (86)
| 
| 10.22 (82)
| Brunswick Street Oval
| 10,500
| 21 May 1949
|- bgcolor="#FFFFFF"
| 
| 11.16 (82)
| 
| 12.9 (81)
| Victoria Park
| 23,000
| 21 May 1949
|- bgcolor="#FFFFFF"
| 
| 18.13 (121)
| 
| 12.10 (82)
| Princes Park
| 28,500
| 21 May 1949
|- bgcolor="#FFFFFF"
| 
| 4.13 (37)
| 
| 8.13 (61)
| Junction Oval
| 7,500
| 21 May 1949
|- bgcolor="#FFFFFF"
| 
| 13.23 (101)
| 
| 12.7 (79)
| Arden Street Oval
| 9,000
| 21 May 1949

Round 7

|- bgcolor="#CCCCFF"
| Home team
| Home team score
| Away team
| Away team score
| Venue
| Crowd
| Date
|- bgcolor="#FFFFFF"
| 
| 6.12 (48)
| 
| 12.15 (87)
| Glenferrie Oval
| 10,000
| 28 May 1949
|- bgcolor="#FFFFFF"
| 
| 11.9 (75)
| 
| 13.12 (90)
| Windy Hill
| 15,000
| 28 May 1949
|- bgcolor="#FFFFFF"
| 
| 8.13 (61)
| 
| 8.7 (55)
| Arden Street Oval
| 17,000
| 28 May 1949
|- bgcolor="#FFFFFF"
| 
| 21.21 (147)
| 
| 9.12 (66)
| Punt Road Oval
| 28,000
| 28 May 1949
|- bgcolor="#FFFFFF"
| 
| 8.10 (58)
| 
| 12.15 (87)
| Western Oval
| 17,000
| 28 May 1949
|- bgcolor="#FFFFFF"
| 
| 8.14 (62)
| 
| 14.11 (95)
| Junction Oval
| 13,000
| 28 May 1949

Round 8

|- bgcolor="#CCCCFF"
| Home team
| Home team score
| Away team
| Away team score
| Venue
| Crowd
| Date
|- bgcolor="#FFFFFF"
| 
| 10.15 (75)
| 
| 11.13 (79)
| Kardinia Park
| 22,500
| 4 June 1949
|- bgcolor="#FFFFFF"
| 
| 21.22 (148)
| 
| 4.12 (36)
| Victoria Park
| 12,000
| 4 June 1949
|- bgcolor="#FFFFFF"
| 
| 14.13 (97)
| 
| 10.7 (67)
| Princes Park
| 29,500
| 4 June 1949
|- bgcolor="#FFFFFF"
| 
| 10.17 (77)
| 
| 10.6 (66)
| MCG
| 11,000
| 4 June 1949
|- bgcolor="#FFFFFF"
| 
| 12.7 (79)
| 
| 14.14 (98)
| Lake Oval
| 12,500
| 4 June 1949
|- bgcolor="#FFFFFF"
| 
| 7.17 (59)
| 
| 10.12 (72)
| Western Oval
| 12,500
| 4 June 1949

Round 9

|- bgcolor="#CCCCFF"
| Home team
| Home team score
| Away team
| Away team score
| Venue
| Crowd
| Date
|- bgcolor="#FFFFFF"
| 
| 17.14 (116)
| 
| 12.7 (79)
| Victoria Park
| 27,500
| 11 June 1949
|- bgcolor="#FFFFFF"
| 
| 10.13 (73)
| 
| 8.15 (63)
| Glenferrie Oval
| 10,000
| 11 June 1949
|- bgcolor="#FFFFFF"
| 
| 15.16 (106)
| 
| 12.9 (81)
| Lake Oval
| 19,500
| 11 June 1949
|- bgcolor="#FFFFFF"
| 
| 11.12 (78)
| 
| 7.7 (49)
| Arden Street Oval
| 10,000
| 13 June 1949
|- bgcolor="#FFFFFF"
| 
| 7.10 (52)
| 
| 10.14 (74)
| Brunswick Street Oval
| 16,000
| 13 June 1949
|- bgcolor="#FFFFFF"
| 
| 12.12 (84)
| 
| 14.15 (99)
| Punt Road Oval
| 46,000
| 13 June 1949

Round 10

|- bgcolor="#CCCCFF"
| Home team
| Home team score
| Away team
| Away team score
| Venue
| Crowd
| Date
|- bgcolor="#FFFFFF"
| 
| 18.25 (133)
| 
| 6.9 (45)
| Arden Street Oval
| 16,000
| 18 June 1949
|- bgcolor="#FFFFFF"
| 
| 20.12 (132)
| 
| 6.10 (46)
| Kardinia Park
| 12,000
| 18 June 1949
|- bgcolor="#FFFFFF"
| 
| 8.19 (67)
| 
| 10.10 (70)
| Windy Hill
| 15,000
| 18 June 1949
|- bgcolor="#FFFFFF"
| 
| 11.12 (78)
| 
| 12.14 (86)
| Princes Park
| 26,500
| 18 June 1949
|- bgcolor="#FFFFFF"
| 
| 7.14 (56)
| 
| 11.11 (77)
| Junction Oval
| 8,500
| 18 June 1949
|- bgcolor="#FFFFFF"
| 
| 16.5 (101)
| 
| 16.8 (104)
| Punt Road Oval
| 29,000
| 18 June 1949

Round 11

|- bgcolor="#CCCCFF"
| Home team
| Home team score
| Away team
| Away team score
| Venue
| Crowd
| Date
|- bgcolor="#FFFFFF"
| 
| 14.17 (101)
| 
| 9.9 (63)
| MCG
| 24,000
| 2 July 1949
|- bgcolor="#FFFFFF"
| 
| 10.12 (72)
| 
| 12.9 (81)
| Brunswick Street Oval
| 14,000
| 2 July 1949
|- bgcolor="#FFFFFF"
| 
| 15.16 (106)
| 
| 6.16 (52)
| Victoria Park
| 12,000
| 2 July 1949
|- bgcolor="#FFFFFF"
| 
| 13.11 (89)
| 
| 14.13 (97)
| Junction Oval
| 7,000
| 2 July 1949
|- bgcolor="#FFFFFF"
| 
| 25.17 (167)
| 
| 11.6 (72)
| Kardinia Park
| 18,000
| 2 July 1949
|- bgcolor="#FFFFFF"
| 
| 9.9 (63)
| 
| 7.16 (58)
| Western Oval
| 13,000
| 2 July 1949

Round 12

|- bgcolor="#CCCCFF"
| Home team
| Home team score
| Away team
| Away team score
| Venue
| Crowd
| Date
|- bgcolor="#FFFFFF"
| 
| 12.11 (83)
| 
| 7.18 (60)
| Western Oval
| 14,000
| 9 July 1949
|- bgcolor="#FFFFFF"
| 
| 14.10 (94)
| 
| 6.13 (49)
| Brunswick Street Oval
| 7,000
| 9 July 1949
|- bgcolor="#FFFFFF"
| 
| 14.17 (101)
| 
| 14.14 (98)
| MCG
| 20,000
| 9 July 1949
|- bgcolor="#FFFFFF"
| 
| 7.0 (42)
| 
| 16.16 (112)
| Glenferrie Oval
| 7,000
| 9 July 1949
|- bgcolor="#FFFFFF"
| 
| 8.6 (54)
| 
| 4.13 (37)
| Arden Street Oval
| 21,000
| 9 July 1949
|- bgcolor="#FFFFFF"
| 
| 6.12 (48)
| 
| 11.15 (81)
| Lake Oval
| 15,000
| 9 July 1949

Round 13

|- bgcolor="#CCCCFF"
| Home team
| Home team score
| Away team
| Away team score
| Venue
| Crowd
| Date
|- bgcolor="#FFFFFF"
| 
| 16.15 (111)
| 
| 13.13 (91)
| Junction Oval
| 6,000
| 16 July 1949
|- bgcolor="#FFFFFF"
| 
| 8.22 (70)
| 
| 6.13 (49)
| Windy Hill
| 16,000
| 16 July 1949
|- bgcolor="#FFFFFF"
| 
| 7.16 (58)
| 
| 10.13 (73)
| Victoria Park
| 22,000
| 16 July 1949
|- bgcolor="#FFFFFF"
| 
| 9.13 (67)
| 
| 9.8 (62)
| Princes Park
| 17,500
| 16 July 1949
|- bgcolor="#FFFFFF"
| 
| 16.21 (117)
| 
| 9.13 (67)
| Punt Road Oval
| 7,000
| 16 July 1949
|- bgcolor="#FFFFFF"
| 
| 13.15 (93)
| 
| 4.10 (34)
| Kardinia Park
| 15,000
| 16 July 1949

Round 14

|- bgcolor="#CCCCFF"
| Home team
| Home team score
| Away team
| Away team score
| Venue
| Crowd
| Date
|- bgcolor="#FFFFFF"
| 
| 11.8 (74)
| 
| 10.12 (72)
| Western Oval
| 13,000
| 23 July 1949
|- bgcolor="#FFFFFF"
| 
| 13.17 (95)
| 
| 9.10 (64)
| Windy Hill
| 9,500
| 23 July 1949
|- bgcolor="#FFFFFF"
| 
| 8.24 (72)
| 
| 17.11 (113)
| Punt Road Oval
| 19,000
| 23 July 1949
|- bgcolor="#FFFFFF"
| 
| 11.15 (81)
| 
| 14.13 (97)
| Lake Oval
| 7,500
| 23 July 1949
|- bgcolor="#FFFFFF"
| 
| 10.11 (71)
| 
| 11.15 (81)
| Brunswick Street Oval
| 21,000
| 23 July 1949
|- bgcolor="#FFFFFF"
| 
| 8.5 (53)
| 
| 9.17 (71)
| Glenferrie Oval
| 9,000
| 23 July 1949

Round 15

|- bgcolor="#CCCCFF"
| Home team
| Home team score
| Away team
| Away team score
| Venue
| Crowd
| Date
|- bgcolor="#FFFFFF"
| 
| 12.7 (79)
| 
| 9.11 (65)
| MCG
| 14,500
| 30 July 1949
|- bgcolor="#FFFFFF"
| 
| 16.23 (119)
| 
| 5.6 (36)
| Victoria Park
| 9,500
| 30 July 1949
|- bgcolor="#FFFFFF"
| 
| 11.16 (82)
| 
| 17.11 (113)
| Princes Park
| 26,500
| 30 July 1949
|- bgcolor="#FFFFFF"
| 
| 13.11 (89)
| 
| 9.14 (68)
| Junction Oval
| 10,000
| 30 July 1949
|- bgcolor="#FFFFFF"
| 
| 8.14 (62)
| 
| 8.11 (59)
| Arden Street Oval
| 14,000
| 30 July 1949
|- bgcolor="#FFFFFF"
| 
| 13.9 (87)
| 
| 6.7 (43)
| Kardinia Park
| 17,500
| 30 July 1949

Round 16

|- bgcolor="#CCCCFF"
| Home team
| Home team score
| Away team
| Away team score
| Venue
| Crowd
| Date
|- bgcolor="#FFFFFF"
| 
| 10.14 (74)
| 
| 8.10 (58)
| Western Oval
| 10,000
| 6 August 1949
|- bgcolor="#FFFFFF"
| 
| 10.19 (79)
| 
| 8.17 (65)
| Brunswick Street Oval
| 4,000
| 6 August 1949
|- bgcolor="#FFFFFF"
| 
| 9.10 (64)
| 
| 8.10 (58)
| Arden Street Oval
| 20,000
| 6 August 1949
|- bgcolor="#FFFFFF"
| 
| 10.9 (69)
| 
| 8.12 (60)
| Junction Oval
| 12,000
| 6 August 1949
|- bgcolor="#FFFFFF"
| 
| 7.14 (56)
| 
| 11.12 (78)
| Punt Road Oval
| 16,000
| 6 August 1949
|- bgcolor="#FFFFFF"
| 
| 7.16 (58)
| 
| 7.13 (55)
| Victoria Park
| 28,000
| 6 August 1949

Round 17

|- bgcolor="#CCCCFF"
| Home team
| Home team score
| Away team
| Away team score
| Venue
| Crowd
| Date
|- bgcolor="#FFFFFF"
| 
| 15.16 (106)
| 
| 7.10 (52)
| MCG
| 18,000
| 13 August 1949
|- bgcolor="#FFFFFF"
| 
| 13.10 (88)
| 
| 9.16 (70)
| Glenferrie Oval
| 9,000
| 13 August 1949
|- bgcolor="#FFFFFF"
| 
| 9.13 (67)
| 
| 10.17 (77)
| Lake Oval
| 10,000
| 13 August 1949
|- bgcolor="#FFFFFF"
| 
| 13.16 (94)
| 
| 8.11 (59)
| Western Oval
| 12,000
| 13 August 1949
|- bgcolor="#FFFFFF"
| 
| 16.21 (117)
| 
| 10.11 (71)
| Windy Hill
| 29,000
| 13 August 1949
|- bgcolor="#FFFFFF"
| 
| 6.11 (47)
| 
| 12.18 (90)
| Kardinia Park
| 24,500
| 13 August 1949

Round 18

|- bgcolor="#CCCCFF"
| Home team
| Home team score
| Away team
| Away team score
| Venue
| Crowd
| Date
|- bgcolor="#FFFFFF"
| 
| 7.14 (56)
| 
| 11.16 (82)
| Kardinia Park
| 14,500
| 20 August 1949
|- bgcolor="#FFFFFF"
| 
| 6.15 (51)
| 
| 9.8 (62)
| Brunswick Street Oval
| 6,000
| 20 August 1949
|- bgcolor="#FFFFFF"
| 
| 9.19 (73)
| 
| 7.14 (56)
| Victoria Park
| 13,500
| 20 August 1949
|- bgcolor="#FFFFFF"
| 
| 13.17 (95)
| 
| 10.14 (74)
| Princes Park
| 10,000
| 20 August 1949
|- bgcolor="#FFFFFF"
| 
| 14.8 (92)
| 
| 8.14 (62)
| Lake Oval
| 4,000
| 20 August 1949
|- bgcolor="#FFFFFF"
| 
| 11.10 (76)
| 
| 15.11 (101)
| MCG
| 58,500
| 20 August 1949

Round 19

|- bgcolor="#CCCCFF"
| Home team
| Home team score
| Away team
| Away team score
| Venue
| Crowd
| Date
|- bgcolor="#FFFFFF"
| 
| 10.16 (76)
| 
| 15.12 (102)
| Glenferrie Oval
| 9,000
| 27 August 1949
|- bgcolor="#FFFFFF"
| 
| 19.12 (126)
| 
| 10.17 (77)
| Brunswick Street Oval
| 7,000
| 27 August 1949
|- bgcolor="#FFFFFF"
| 
| 14.13 (97)
| 
| 8.13 (61)
| Windy Hill
| 20,000
| 27 August 1949
|- bgcolor="#FFFFFF"
| 
| 22.12 (144)
| 
| 10.15 (75)
| Punt Road Oval
| 11,000
| 27 August 1949
|- bgcolor="#FFFFFF"
| 
| 11.15 (81)
| 
| 10.12 (72)
| Junction Oval
| 17,000
| 27 August 1949
|- bgcolor="#FFFFFF"
| 
| 15.18 (108)
| 
| 7.10 (52)
| Arden Street Oval
| 35,116
| 27 August 1949

Ladder

Finals

First Semi-Final

Second Semi-Final

Preliminary Final

Grand final

Awards
 The 1949 VFL Premiership team was Essendon.
 The VFL's leading goalkicker was John Coleman of Essendon with 100 goals (including 15 goals in the final series).
 The winner of the 1949 Brownlow Medal was Ron Clegg of South Melbourne with 23 votes on a countback from Colin Austen of Hawthorn (because Clegg had been best on the ground six times to Austen's five).
As a consequence of its 1981 decision to change its rules relating to tied Brownlow Medal contests, the AFL awarded a retrospective medal to Colin Austen in 1989.
 Hawthorn took the "wooden spoon" in 1949.
Melbourne 17.10 (112) defeated  9.14 (68) in the Grand Final, played as a curtain-raiser to the senior Grand Final on Saturday 24 September at the Melbourne Cricket Ground.

Notable events
 In Round 1, John Coleman of Essendon kicked 12 goals in his first VFL game; he was best on the ground. He kicked a goal with his first kick in VFL football, having taken a mark in the first seconds of the match; and he kicked a goal with his last kick of the 1949 season, in last minutes of the Grand Final, to bring his season's total to 100 goals.
 In Round 12, Hawthorn scored seven goals and no behinds in its match against Essendon. This is the first time since Round 9, 1899 that a team did not score a single behind in a VFL match.
 In Round 19, Richmond's captain-coach Jack Dyer played his last VFL game, having played 16 games for Victoria, 312 senior games for Richmond, and 12 games in Richmond Seconds over 19 VFL seasons.

References

 Hogan, P., The Tigers of Old, The Richmond Football Club, (Richmond), 1996. 
 Maplestone, M., Flying Higher: History of the Essendon Football Club 1872–1996, Essendon Football Club, (Melbourne), 1996. 
 Rogers, S. & Brown, A., Every Game Ever Played: VFL/AFL Results 1897–1997 (Sixth Edition), Viking Books, (Ringwood), 1998. 
 Ross, J. (ed), 100 Years of Australian Football 1897–1996: The Complete Story of the AFL, All the Big Stories, All the Great Pictures, All the Champions, Every AFL Season Reported, Viking, (Ringwood), 1996.

External links
 1949 Season – AFL Tables

Australian Football League seasons
Vfl season